Agnathosia sandoeensis is a moth belonging to the family Tineidae. The species was first described by Jan Å. Jonasson in 1977.

It is native to Northern Europe.

References

Tineidae